SMS Radetzky was a screw frigate in the Austro-Hungarian Navy, built in England in 1856 and lost through explosion of the powder magazine in 1869.

Construction 
Radetzky was built by Money Wigram & Sons of London, in their shipyard at Northam, Southampton. The ship, named after nobleman and field marshal Joseph Radetzky von Radetz, was launched on 13 April 1854. After initial fitting-out in Southampton, the frigate sailed for the Mediterranean, returning to England on 9 August. She subsequently sailed to the River Thames for installation of her 300 nhp engines by Maudslay, Sons and Field, which was completed on 1 October 1854.

Service record 
She participated in the Battle of Heligoland during the Second Schleswig War in 1864 and the Battle of Lissa during the Austro-Prussian War in 1866, the former sometimes cited as the 'last clash of wooden warships.'

Loss 
In 1869, the ship's powder magazine exploded off the coast of Vis and she sank. Of the complement of 368 men, 345 died in the incident. Following the rediscovery of the wreck in 2014, a memorial service was held, and the names of those who perished are retained in the church on Sveti Klement.

References

Sources 
 
 
 
 
 

1854 ships
Frigates of the Austro-Hungarian Navy
Maritime incidents in February 1869
Ships built in Southampton